One More Kiss may refer to:

Film and TV
One More Kiss (film), 2000 Scottish film with Gerard Butler
One More Kiss (Desperate Housewives)

Music
"One More Kiss", song by Stephen Sondheim from the musical Follies
"One More Kiss", song by Paul McCartney and Wings, from the 1973 album Red Rose Speedway
"One More Kiss", song by Meat Loaf from 1986 album Blind Before I Stop
"One More Kiss", song by Johnny "Guitar" Watson written by Johnny Watson
"One More Kiss", song by Jimmy Dorsey
"One More Kiss", song by Jim Hall (musician)
"One More Kiss", song by Deniece Williams, Glass, Williams. from 1996 album Love Solves It All
"One More Kiss, Dear", song by Peter Skellern and Vangelis from the Blade Runner soundtrack